is an upcoming action role-playing game developed and published by Square Enix. The sixteenth main installment in the Final Fantasy series, it is scheduled for release on June 22, 2023 for the PlayStation 5 as a timed exclusive. The game will feature segmented open environments and an action-based combat system involving both melee and magic-based attacks. There are also recurring series features including Chocobos, and summoned monsters called Eikons which are both fought as bosses and used through channelling their power in combat.

Final Fantasy XVI is set on Valisthea, a world divided between six nations who hold power through access to magical Crystals and Dominants, humans who act as hosts for each nation's Eikon. Tensions between the nations escalate as a malady dubbed the Blight begins consuming the land. Clive Rosfield, guardian to his younger brother Joshua, witnesses his kingdom destroyed and goes on a revenge quest in pursuit of the dark Eikon Ifrit.

Beginning concept development in 2015, the staff included Naoki Yoshida as producer, Hiroshi Takai as main director, artists Hiroshi Minagawa and Kazuya Takahashi, Kazutoyo Maehiro as creative director and lead writer, Masayoshi Soken as composer, and Capcom veteran Ryota Suzuki as battle designer. Yoshida's aim was for a dark fantasy storyline which would have broad appeal and reinvigorate the series. Its production and promotion was impacted by the COVID-19 pandemic, and later by the Russian invasion of Ukraine.

Gameplay

Final Fantasy XVI is an action role-playing game in which players take control of protagonist Clive Rosfield and a rotating party of AI-controlled companions through segmented open areas across the continents of Valisthea. Combat revolves around a combination of melee and magic attacks, with Clive able to dodge. During the game Clive ends up in battles with summoned monsters called Eikons, with their battles having dedicated mechanics. After defeating them, Clive gains access to powers and fighting techniques themed around them. Recurring Final Fantasy elements, such as the galliform Chocobo and monster types, are included in the game world. The game has two separate modes; a "Story" mode which offers accessories to simplify combat and strengthen the characters, and a normal mode which presents a greater challenge. There is also going to be a New Game+ which allows players to carry over their statistics and equipment into a campaign with increased difficulty.

Synopsis

Setting and characters
Final Fantasy XVI is set on Valisthea, a world split between the two continents Ash and Storm scattered with magical Mothercrystals which provide aether energy to the population, though overuse causes magic users to petrify. In the backstory, a technologically-advanced sky-based civilization once dominated the world. 1500 years before, a great war caused the sky civilization to collapse, with remnants of it scattering across Valisthea. In the present, the sky civilization is treated as a legend. The Mothercrystals become focuses for later civilization, with six nations controlling Valisthea by the game's events. A powerful force in Valisthea are the Eikons, magical creatures based on summoned monsters from the Final Fantasy series. The known Eikons – Phoenix, Shiva, Titan, Garuda, Leviathan, Bahamut, Odin and Ramuh – each represent one element and typically never fight each other. A seemingly-impossible second Eikon of fire, Ifrit, drives the main plot by disrupting this balance.

The core nations of Valisthea are the Grand Duchy of Rosaria, the Holy Empire of Sanbreque, and the Dhalmekian Republic on the Storm continent, the Kingdom of Waloed which dominates the Ash continent, and the neutral Crystalline Dominion sitting between Ash and Storm. An outlier is the Iron Kingdom, an isolated nation off the coast of Storm overseen by the Crystalline Orthodox which speaks its own language. By the game's events, Valisthea is suffering from a depletion of aether dubbed the Blight, driving the nations into conflict with each other. A key part of the nations' politics and military are Dominants, humans who can use magic without crystals and manifest Eikons, though they are more at risk from petrification. Depending on where they are born, Dominants are hailed as political leaders, tolerated due to their power, or suffer abuse and are either killed or used as weapons of war.

The game's protagonist is Clive Rosfield, firstborn son of Rosaria's ruling family who is passed over as successor when his younger brother Joshua becomes the Dominant of Phoenix; while not a Dominant, Clive can acquire and wield the power of multiple Eikons in combat. A childhood friend and future companion is Jill Warrick, the eventual Dominant of Shiva who spends much of her life as a political hostage. During his travels Clive is joined by his dog Torgal; and Cidolfus Telamon, the Dominant of Ramuh who seeks to establish a nation to shelter victimised magic users, and an incarnation of a recurring Final Fantasy character. Other prominent characters include Barnabas Tharmr, king of Waloed and Dominant of Odin; Benedikta Harman, a Waloed spy and Dominant of Garuda; Hugo Kupka, Dominant of Titan and key political figure in the Dhalmekian Republic; and Dion Lesage, crown prince of Sanbreque and the Dominant of Bahamut.

Plot
Clive begins the game as Joshua's bodyguard during a time of growing unrest in Valisthea. While Clive is not Phoenix's Dominant, Joshua shares the power of Phoenix with him. The Duchy is attacked with tragic results, and in the ensuing chaos the dark Eikon Ifrit manifests.To find a purpose for himself, Clive became the First Shield of Rosaria, tasked with protecting Joshua and blessed by the Phoenix, allowing Clive to use part of its flames. Tragic events involving the dark Eikon, Ifrit, led to Clive embarking on a quest for revenge. At the beginning of the story, Clive is 15 years old.

Development

Final Fantasy XVI was produced by Creative Business Unit III, a development studio within franchise developer and publisher Square Enix. The staff included members from the massively multiplayer online role-playing game (MMORPG) Final Fantasy XIV, and multiple veterans of the Ivalice universe. The producer, Naoki Yoshida, is known for his work on Final Fantasy XIV as both producer and director. The main director was Hiroshi Takai, known for his work on the SaGa series and The Last Remnant. Kazutoyo Maehiro acted as creative director and lead writer. Hiroshi Minagawa acts as art director, while the characters were designed by Kazuya Takahashi. The logo, portraying the Eikons Phoenix and Ifrit in battle and tying into the game's themes and story, was designed by long-time illustrator Yoshitaka Amano.

Concept work for the game began in 2015 after Square Enix CEO Yosuke Matsuda approached Yoshida to develop the next mainline Final Fantasy. Yoshida, who was finishing up production on the Final Fantasy XIV expansion Heavensward, understood the choice as Creative Business Unit I had begun work on Final Fantasy VII Remake, but he needed to balance his work between Final Fantasy XIV and Final Fantasy XVI. To lay the groundwork, Yoshida assembled a small planning team made up of himself, Maehiro and lead game designer Mitsutoshi Gondai. Yoshida decided to become producer as his duties as both producer and director for Final Fantasy XIV were too time-consuming to take on a second large-scale project. Takai, who had also worked with Yoshida on Final Fantasy XIV, was picked as main director for his experience on the series, his popularity among the development team and his experience on visual effects. Full production on Final Fantasy XVI began in 2016 following Patch 3.4 of Heavensward, when Takai and Maehiro had trusted replacements in place for the next expansion Stormblood.

Takai's main goal for the game was an action-based combat that was easy to use, and a mature dark fantasy narrative that would tackle difficult themes. Yoshida wanted the game to cater to neither children or adults but rather something that will reach "players of all generations". He also wanted to separate the game from commonly-associated stereotypes such as anime-inspired art style and a story focusing on teenagers. It was initially developed as a PlayStation 5 exclusive, with a PlayStation 4 version being considered but abandoned so as not to limit the team's ambitions. Due to the COVID-19 pandemic, the staff needed to move to remote working, and production ended up half a year behind schedule due to communication issues with both Square Enix's head office and outsourcing companies. By late 2020, basic work on development and game scenarios was complete and work was continuing on "large scale" resources like boss battles and development tools. By April 2022, development was in its final stages, with the team finalising side quests. It was fully playable from start to finish by June of that year, with development focusing both on polishing the game and voice recording for different languages.

Design
When choosing the game's combat system, Yoshida conducted surveys within the Final Fantasy community, finding a division between fans of action-based and more traditional turn-based combat. After considering the potential impact on sales and modern gaming trends, he opted for a real-time action-based battle system. Yoshida admitted that this approach alongside other gameplay decisions risked polarizing series fans, but believed that trying to please every fan by incorporating every element possible would "run the risk of creating a half-baked compromise of a game". During the game's early production, the growing team had a system of designing gameplay tests and completely scrapping those that did not work, with  Square Enix's upper management getting frustrated with the team's slow pace. The team decided against an open world, as it would have extended development time beyond a practical limit. Clive was made the only controllable character, with other party members driven by AI to simplify the player's control needs, though commands were included to allow for limited control.

Outside the Kingdom Hearts team, Square Enix had little experience designing action combat. Yoshida sought out Ryota Suzuki, a Capcom veteran who had worked on the Devil May Cry series, as battle designer. The battle system was designed around the idea of turning the ability system of Final Fantasy V into a real-time combat system. The Eikon battles all had unique mechanics that were not used again in-game. One of the earliest completed Eikon battles was with Garuda, with its foundation remaining mostly unchanged throughout production. There were no loading screens related to this setpiece battles, with gameplay and dialogue all being mixed together seamlessly. During the first half of development, an Eikon-based job system was intended for Clive, but it was dropped due to its restrictions on Clive's in-game appearance. Classic Final Fantasy jobs was used as a design inspiration for enemies and some NPCs.

Yoshida brought Maehiro on board due to liking his writing style and world-building. While he accepted, Maehiro was also busy working on the Heavensward scenario, only starting full work in 2016. Maehiro created the initial script, which was checked and completed by Michael-Christopher "Koji" Fox. In addition to the scenario, all the game's dialogue was written before any of the game design was finalised. The script was written first in Japanese, then translated into English for initial dialogue and cutscene recording. The traditional medieval setting and style was chosen because a lot of the core members really enjoy that style from classic Final Fantasy games the most. The shift was also done in response to a growing feeling among fans and critics that the series was moving too far towards science fiction, and that this style was causing the series to become "static". Working from the concept of Eikons having prominence, Maehiro created the world map and based the nations around their local geography before creating the story around that setting. While initially Chocobos and Moogles were not included, staff protests prompted Maehiro to adjust his world design to allow for their logical incorporation.

While the game had a large cast and prominent female characters, the game was always considered as Clive's story and the relationships he forms with different people through the warring nations. The story's central theme was the clashing of values. Clive and Dion were designed as aesthetic opposites, built around the archetypes of princes of darkness and light respectively. Crystals, a recurring feature in the series, were portrayed here as an analogy to depleted fossil fuels, while Dominants and Eikons acted as analogies for weapons of mass destruction. A recurring marketing tagline, "The legacy of the crystals has shaped our history for long enough", was meant to symbolise both a break from the science fiction style of recent entries and a questioning of the crystal's role of bestowing power on humans. The Eikons were based on established fan favorite summons from across the Final Fantasy series, with Ifrit given a prominent role to contrast his earlier portrayal as a summon for beginners. Most of the story was told using real-time cutscenes and in-game dialogue, though pre-rendered CGI scenes were featured. These scenes were directed by Takeshi Nozue. Compared to other recent Final Fantasy titles, there was no plan for "tertiary content" such as downloadable content and books, instead having the entire story told within the game.

Speaking on the portrayal of ethnic diversity in the game's world, Yoshida stated that its relative lack of diversity fitted into both its Medieval European setting and the in-universe isolation of the lands. He admitted potential representation issues, but foresaw problems with both breaking player immersion in the setting and problematic stereotypes being associated with ethnic minority protagonists or antagonists. The team ultimately decided to focus on the characters' personalities and narratives over their appearance. The localization is being directed by Fox, who also leads the localization of Final Fantasy XIV. While the script was written in Japanese, in contrast to earlier entries it was translated and motion captured in English. Yoshida stayed away from the recording process both due to company policy and out of "respect" for the writers as he would likely contradict their decisions and cause issues. All the English voice work was done by European actors, a non-standard approach to appeal to the North American market.

Music
The music is being composed by Masayoshi Soken. Soken had worked with Yoshida and Takai on Final Fantasy XIV, and was brought on board due to his familiarity with Yoshida, Takai and Maehiro's world design style. Having worked for a long time on the MMORPG Final Fantasy XIV, which used multiple styles and paid homage to the entire series, Soken had trouble adjusting to composing for a single-player with a central narrative and musical theme. One recalled episode from the music writing was a bardic song performed both in spoken and sung form by a trained singer and actor that would change depending on Clive's position in the story. The songs proved difficult as they needed localizing in several languages and recording a cappella, which resulted in issues with the pitch and tempo.

Release
Rumors emerged in late 2019 about Final Fantasy XVI due to reports that Creative Business Unit III had finished groundwork for a major new title. The game was officially announced in September 2020. The trailer used real-time footage instead of pre-rendered cutscenes to show the game was well into development and not too far from release. The second trailer, released in June 2022 and showcasing the Eikons and related gameplay and story scenes, was ready that March. Due to the invasion of Ukraine the previous month, the team decided to hold off releasing the trailer due to the game's portrayal of warring nations. Yoshida recorded a message to preface the trailer to separate it from world events. A third trailer, featuring more gameplay content and the release date, was published in December at The Game Awards 2022.

Final Fantasy XVI is set for a worldwide release on June 22, 2023. It was notably given high age ratings in each major region (CERO's D rating, PEGI's 18 rating, and the ESRB's Mature rating). It will be a timed exclusive for six months following its release. While a Windows version was rumored based on the timed exclusivity, Yoshida denied knowledge of such a port. The game had digital and physical Deluxe and Collector's Editions available for sale through Square Enix's online store, featuring additional in-game items and accessories such as an art book and steelcase with unique art. The English and Japanese voice cast was announced in December 2022. There was some brief online controversy around the game's perceived lack of ethnic diversity and the team's explanation for it. There was a similar response inspired by Yoshida's reluctance to classify the game under the "JRPG" moniker, as he was uncomfortable with negative associations historically attached to the term.

References

Notes

External links
 
	

Upcoming video games scheduled for 2023
Action role-playing video games
Fantasy video games
Final Fantasy video games
Japanese role-playing video games
PlayStation 5 games
PlayStation 5-only games
Single-player video games
Video games about revenge
Video games developed in Japan
Video games scored by Masayoshi Soken